Harry Meakin (8 September 1919 – 1986) was an English footballer who played in the Football League for Stoke City.

Career
Meakin was born in Stoke-on-Trent and joined Stoke City from local feeder club Summerbank during World War II. He was signed as a backup defender but found himself playing as a regular in 1947–48 after injury to key defender Neil Franklin. Afterwards he reverted to his bit part role and left for Northwich Victoria in 1950.

Career statistics

References

English footballers
Stoke City F.C. players
Northwich Victoria F.C. players
English Football League players
1919 births
1986 deaths
Association football fullbacks